A heraldic authority is defined as an office or institution which has been established by a reigning monarch or a government to deal with heraldry in the country concerned. It does not include private societies or enterprises which design and/or register coats of arms. Over the centuries, many countries have established heraldic authorities, and several still flourish today.

Europe

Belgium

 The Council of Nobility (1844–present) – deals with grants arms to the nobility in all of Belgium and municipal arms in the German Speaking Community of Belgium.
Council of Heraldry and Vexillology (1985–present) – supervises and advises the Government of the French Community regarding registration of non-noble personal, familial and municipal arms within the French Community of Belgium.
Flemish Heraldic Council (1984–present) – supervises and advises the Flemish Government regarding grants of non-noble personal, official, municipal, and corporate arms within the Flemish Community of Belgium.

Burgundy
 Toison d'Or King of Arms (1431–?)

Croatia
 Ministry of Public Administration – Commission for approving the coat-of-arms and flags to the local self-government units
The commission deals only with municipal heraldry and vexillology. It is composed of five members appointed on a four years mandate by the Minister: jurist, heraldist, archivist, historian and visual artist. Pursuant to article 10. Law on the local self-government units, all municipal coats of arms have to be made and blazoned in accordance with heraldic rules. Ministry will issue armorial to municipality in the form of a booklet composed of 8 pages. The Armorial is made in three copies of which one is obtained by : unit of local self-government, Croatian State Archives and the Ministry of Public Administration.

Czech Republic 
 Chamber of Deputies of the Parliament of the Czech Republic – Subcommittee on heraldry and vexillology
The subcommittee deals only with municipal heraldry and vexillology. The grants of arms approved by the committee are signed by the Speaker of the Chamber of Deputies. The Czech Republic has no heraldic authority for personal arms.

Denmark
 Statens Heraldiske Konsulent (State Heraldic Advisor) (1938– ). The National Archives of Denmark is the State Heraldry Advisor since 1985.

Finland
 Heraldinen lautakunta (Heraldic Board), founded in 1957, known 1957–88 as Heraldinen toimikunta (Heraldic Committee). It operates as a part of the National Archives of Finland.

France
 College d'armes (1407–1790)
 Commission nationale d'héraldique (1999–present), operating as part of the National Archives of France.

Georgia

 State Council of Heraldry (2008–present)

Germany
Holy Roman Empire
 Reichsherold (Imperial Herald) (1520–?)

Bavaria
 Reichsherold (Royal Herald) (1808–1920)

Prussia
 Oberheroldsamt (1706–1713)  – dealt with noble and municipal arms.
 Königlich Preussisches Heroldsamt (Royal Prussian Heraldry Office) (1855–1920)

Saxony
 Kommissariatt für Adelsangelegenheiten (Commission for Noble Affairs) (1902–1920)

Hungary
 Országos Községi Törzskönyvbizottság (National Municipal Register Committee) (1898–1949)
 Képző és Iparművészeti Lektorátus (Lectorate of Visual and Applied Arts) (1970s–1990)
 Nemzeti Címer Bizottság (National Coat of Arms Committee) (2016– )

Ireland
 Ulster Office (1552–1943), headed by Ulster King of Arms.
 Genealogical Office (1943– ), headed by the Chief Herald of Ireland and forming part of the National Library of Ireland – grants personal, official, municipal, and corporate arms.

Italy
 Consulta Araldica (Heraldry Council) (1869–1947)
 Istituto Nazionale del Nastro Azzurro  (King Vittorio Emanuele III allowed the Istituto Nazionale to grant heraldic coats of arms to members since 1927; the Istituto was recognized by the Italian Republic in 1966)
 Ufficio Cerimoniale della Presidenza del Consiglio dei Ministri (since 1947)

Latvia
 State Heraldry Commission (1997– ), forming part of the Presidency – deals with official and municipal arms.

Lithuania
 Heraldry Commission (1988– ), forming part of the Presidency – deals with official and municipal arms.

Luxembourg
 Commission héraldique de l'Etat (State Heraldic Commission)

Malta 

 Office of the Chief Herald of Arms of Malta (2019–present), an agency of Heritage Malta — deals with personal, corporate and municipal arms.

(Note : although the office was established in 2019, the necessary legislation was passed only in 2021, and the regulations bringing it into operation were gazetted in 2022.  All grants and registrations made between 2019 and 2022 were gazetted in April 2022, to make them official.)

Netherlands
 Hoge Raad van Adel (High Council of the Nobility) (1815– ) – grants personal arms (to nobles only) and official, military, and municipal arms. Also provides advice regarding arms of members of the royal family.

Norway
 Ministry of Foreign Affairs – all matters concerning the Coat of arms of Norway (Norwegian: Riksvåpenet = Coat of arms of the realm)

Poland
 Komisja Heraldyczna (Heraldic Commission)

Portugal
 Cartório da Nobreza (Nobility Register) (1521–1910) – heraldic authority for the Kingdom of Portugal;
 Comissão de Heráldica da Associação dos Arqueólogos Portugueses (Heraldic Commission of the Association of Portuguese Archeologists) (1930 – ) – heraldic authority for the municipalities of Portugal;
 Gabinete de Heráldica Corporativa (Office for Corporate Heraldry) (1930–1974) – heraldic authority for the corporations (trade unions, guilds, etc.);
 Secção de Heráldica da Direção de Cultura e História Militar (Heraldry Section of the Directorate of Military History and Culture) (1969 – ) – heraldic authority for the Portuguese Army;
 Gabinete de Heráldica Naval (Office for Naval Heraldry) (1972 – ) – heraldic authority for the Portuguese Navy;
 Adjunto de Heráldica do Arquivo Histórico da Força Aérea (Heraldry Deputy of the Air Force Historical Archive) (1977 – ) – heraldic authority for the Portuguese Air Force;
 Gabinete de Heráldica Autárquica (Office for Municipal Heraldry) (foreseen in 1991, but never created) – heraldic authority for the municipalities of Portugal.

Russia
 Office of Heraldry (1722–1917), headed by the Master Herald – granted personal, official, and municipal arms.
 Heraldic Council of the President of the Russian Federation or State Heraldry Service (1992– ), headed by the Master Herald and forming part of the President's Office.

Slovakia
 Heraldic Commission
 Heraldic Registry of the Slovak Republic (part of Ministry of Interior)

Spain
 Real Academia de la Historia (Royal Academy of History). For Asturias, Cantabria, Castilla–La Mancha, La Rioja and Balearic Islands.
 Consejo Asesor de Heráldica y Simbología de Aragón (Advisory Council of Heraldry and Symbology of Aragon). For Aragon.
Sociedad de Estudios Vascos/Eusko Ikaskuntza (Basque Studies Society). For Basque Country.
 Instituto de Estudios Canarios (Institute for Canary Studies). For Canary Islands.
 Cronistas de Armas de Castilla y León (Recorders of Arms), established in 1496. For provinces of Castile and León.
 Institut d'Estudis Catalans (Institute for Catalan Studies). For Catalonia.
 Comisión de Heráldica de Galicia (Galician Heraldry Commission). For Galicia.
 Real Academia Matritense de Heráldica y Genealogía (Royal Matritense Academy of Heraldry and Genealogy), together with the Real Academia de la Historia, for Madrid.
 Real Academia Alfonso X el Sabio (Royal Academy Alfonso X the Wise). For the Region of Murcia.
 Consell Tècnic d'Heràldica i Vexil·logia (Technical Council of Heraldry and Vexilogy). For Valencian Community.

Sweden
 Riksheraldiker (National Herald) (1734–1953)
 Statens Heraldiska Nämnd (State Heraldry Office) (1953– ), headed by a State Herald, and forming part of the Royal Archives. registered with the Swedish Patent and Registration Office (Patent- och registreringsverket or PRV). Only official arms (royal and civic arms) are handled. Burgher and commoner arms are less strictly controlled and may be recognized by publication in the annual Scandinavian Roll of Arms.

United Kingdom
England and Wales
 College of Arms (1484- ), headed by the Garter Principal King of Arms, under the general jurisdiction of the Earl Marshal – grants personal, municipal, and corporate arms, also records pedigrees and genealogies.

Northern Ireland
Until 1943, Northern Ireland came under the Ulster Office; since then, it has fallen under the College of Arms part of the jurisdiction of the Norroy and Ulster King of Arms which also covers the counties of England and Wales North of the River Trent.

Scotland
 Court of the Lord Lyon, headed by the Lord Lyon (c. 1399?-  ) – grants personal, municipal, and corporate arms; it is illegal to bear arms in Scotland unless they have been granted or recorded by the Lord Lyon.

Africa

Kenya
 Kenya College of Arms (1968– ), headed by a Registrar, and forming part of the Attorney-General's Office – grants and registers personal, municipal, and corporate coats of arms. It was established by the College of Arms Act of 1968.

South Africa
 Department of the Interior (1935–1959) – inter alia registered the arms of associations and institutions, as "badges".
 Provincial administrations (1949–1963) – inter alia registered the arms of municipalities in their respective provinces.
 Department of Education, Arts & Sciences (1959–1963) – inter alia registered the arms of associations and institutions, as "badges".
 Bureau of Heraldry (1963– ), headed by the National Herald (formerly State Herald), and forming part of the National Archives & Records Service – registers personal, official, military, municipal, and corporate arms. Together with the Heraldry Council, it forms part of the National Archives and Records Service (formerly called the State Archives Service), which is currently under the authority of the Minister of Arts & Culture.

The Heraldry Act 1962, which governs the Bureau of Heraldry, has not been changed to replace "State herald" with "National Herald". Announcements in the Government Gazette of South Africa still use "State Herald".

Zambia
 Colours Control Board (1958– ) – inter alia registers the arms of associations and institutions, as "badges".

Zimbabwe
 Registrar of Names, Uniforms, Badges and Heraldic Representations (1971– ), forming part of the Patents Office – registers official, municipal, corporate, and personal arms.

Bunyoro-Kitara, Uganda
 Heraldry Society of Africa (2016– ), forming a repository of historic and current heraldry within the sub-monarchy of Bunyoro-Kitara, and all of the continent of Africa, and as warranted abroad.

Asia

Azerbaijan
 Heraldic Council (2006– ), forming part of the Presidency.

Georgia
 State Council of Heraldry at the Parliament of Georgia (established in 2008)

Philippines
Philippine Heraldry Committee (1940–1972) – government coat of arms, seals, and other symbols of state
National Historical Commission of the Philippines (1972–) – absorbed responsibilities of the Philippine Heraldry Committee after the Reorganization Act of 1972. Final approval of works required from the Office of the President

North America

Canada
 Canadian Heraldic Authority (1988– ), headed by the Chief Herald of Canada and forming part of the Governor General's Household – grants personal, corporate, governmental, military and other organizational arms.

United States
 Carolina Herald was an English herald responsible for heraldry in Carolina in early and mid 18th Century colonial times.
 The Institute of Heraldry, U.S. Army, is the organization responsible for furnishing heraldic services to the President of the United States and all federal government agencies.

Oceania

New Zealand
 New Zealand Herald Extraordinary (1978– ) in the Governor-General's Household – represents the English College of Arms.

References

External links
Canadian Heraldic Authority
 Chief Herald of Ireland
 College of Arms (England)
 Court of the Lord Lyon (Scotland)
 Hoge Raad van Adel (Netherlands)
 Staats Heraldiske Namnd (Sweden)
Council of nobility (Belgium)
Council of heraldry and vexillology (Belgium)
 Vlaamsche Heraldische Raad (Belgium)
Von Volborth, C.A.  Heraldry of the World. (1973)

 
Heraldry and law